The 2015 Thailand Open Grand Prix Gold was the twentieth grand prix gold and grand prix tournament of the 2015 BWF Grand Prix and Grand Prix Gold. The tournament was held in Thunder Done, Muangthong Thani, Bangkok, Thailand September 29 – October 4, 2015 and had a total purse of $120,000.

Men's singles

Seeds

  Son Wan-ho (quarter-final)
  Hu Yun (third round)
  Tommy Sugiarto (withdrew)
  Lee Hyun-il (champion)
  Wei Nan (withdrew)
  Tanongsak Saensomboonsuk (second round)
  Dionysius Hayom Rumbaka (Semi final)
  Boonsak Ponsana (third round)
  Ng Ka Long (quarter-final)
  Wong Wing Ki (second round)
  Chong Wei Feng (first round)
  Zulfadli Zulkiffli (withdrew)
  Jonatan Christie (third round)
  Derek Wong Zi Liang (third round)
  Kazumasa Sakai (third round)
  Firman Abdul Kholik (third round)

Finals

Top half

Section 1

Section 2

Section 3

Section 4

Bottom half

Section 5

Section 6

Section 7

Section 8

Women's singles

Seeds

  Ratchanok Inthanon (Semi final)
  Sung Ji-hyun (champion)
  Sun Yu (Semi final)
  Bae Yeon-ju (first round)
  Busanan Ongbumrungpan (second round)
  Sayaka Sato (quarter-final)
  Porntip Buranaprasertsuk (second round)
  Maria Febe Kusumastuti (first round)

Finals

Top half

Section 1

Section 2

Bottom half

Section 3

Section 4

Men's doubles

Seeds

  Ko Sung-hyun / Shin Baek-cheol (withdrew)
  Angga Pratama / Ricky Karanda Suwardi (Semi final)
  Li Junhui / Liu Yuchen (second round)
  Kim Ki-jung / Kim Sa-rang (withdrew)
  Wahyu Nayaka / Ade Yusuf (champion)
  Kenta Kazuno / Kazushi Yamada (second round)
  Andrei Adistia / Hendra Aprida Gunawan (first round)
  Wang Yilv / Zhang Wen (second round)

Finals

Top half

Section 1

Section 2

Bottom half

Section 3

Section 4

Women's doubles

Seeds

  Nitya Krishinda Maheswari / Greysia Polii (withdrew)
  Vivian Hoo Kah Mun / Woon Khe Wei (quarter-final)
  Shizuka Matsuo / Mami Naito (quarter-final)
  Puttita Supajirakul / Sapsiree Taerattanachai (first round)
  Tang Jinhua / Tian Qing (withdrew)
  Amelia Alicia Anscelly / Soong Fie Cho (quarter-final)
  Jongkongphan Kittiharakul / Rawinda Prajongjai (first round)
  Go Ah-ra / Yoo Hae-won (Semi final)

Finals

Top half

Section 1

Section 2

Bottom half

Section 3

Section 4

Mixed doubles

Seeds

  Ko Sung-hyun / Kim Ha-na (Semi final)
  Riky Widianto / Richi Puspita Dili (second round)
  Praveen Jordan / Debby Susanto (final)
  Lee Chun Hei / Chau Hoi Wah (first round)
  Zheng Siwei / Chen Qingchen (second round)
  Edi Subaktiar / Gloria Emanuelle Widjaja (first round)
  Huang Kaixiang / Huang Dongping (Semi final)
  Chan Yun Lung / Tse Ying Suet (quarter-final)

Finals

Top half

Section 1

Section 2

Bottom half

Section 3

Section 4

References

Thailand Open (badminton)
Thailand Open
Thailand Open Grand Prix Gold
Badminton, Grand Prix Gold, Thailand Open
Badminton, Grand Prix Gold, Thailand Open
Badminton, Grand Prix Gold, Thailand Open
Badminton, Grand Prix Gold, Thailand Open